My Wife and the Dog (translit. Zawgaty Wal Kalb) is a 1971 Egyptian drama film directed by Said Marzouk. The film was selected as the Egyptian entry for the Best Foreign Language Film at the 45th Academy Awards, but was not accepted as a nominee.

Cast
 Soad Hosny
 Nour El-Sherif 
 Mahmoud Moursy 
 Abdel Moneim Bahnassy 
 Zizi Mustafa

See also
 List of submissions to the 45th Academy Awards for Best Foreign Language Film
 List of Egyptian submissions for the Academy Award for Best Foreign Language Film

References

External links

1971 films
1971 drama films
1970s Arabic-language films
Egyptian black-and-white films
Egyptian drama films